Ghulfan (also Gulfan, Uncu, Uncunwee, Wunci, Wuncimbe) is a Hill Nubian language spoken in the central Nuba Mountains in the south of Sudan. It is spoken by around 33,000 people in the Ghulfan Kurgul and Ghulfan Morung hills, south of Dilling. The villages in which the language is spoken are Dabri, Karkandi, Katang, Kurgul, Namang, Ninya, Moring, Ota, Shigda, and Tarda. It is closely related to Kadaru, with which it forms the Kadaru-Ghulfan subgroup of Hill Nubian.

Ethnologue reports that the use of Ghulfan is decreasing as younger speakers switch to Sudanese Arabic and that there are no monolingual speakers of the language.

References 

Nubian languages
Languages of Sudan